Hugh John Carthy (born 9 July 1994) is a British professional road racing cyclist who currently rides for UCI WorldTeam . Carthy's nickname "Huge" was coined when his name was mispronounced by an announcer in the Giro d'Italia, but stuck due to his ability to produce huge efforts and dig deep.

Career 
In 2014 he won the Tour de Korea stage race, and in 2015, he joined the Spanish team . He was named in the start list for the 2016 Vuelta a España and the start list for the 2017 Giro d'Italia. Carthy crashed out on stage 6 of the 2019 Vuelta a España, being one of four riders to abandon due to the crash. In August 2020, he was named in the startlist for the 2020 Tour de France.

On 1 November 2020, Carthy notched his first grand tour stage win on the 2020 Vuelta a España's stage 12, which featured a summit finish on the Alto de l'Angliru. His time climbing the Angrilu was among the all time top 10 and no one had ridden the climb faster since Chris Horner won the Vuelta there in 2013. He went on to finish third overall, his first podium in a grand tour.

Major results

2012
 1st  Overall Junior Tour of Wales
1st  Mountains classification
1st Stage 2
2014
 1st  Overall Tour de Korea
1st  Young rider classification
1st Stage 7
 6th Overall Tour of Japan
1st  Mountains classification
1st  Young rider classification
 6th Overall Mzansi Tour
1st Prologue (TTT)
2015
 9th Overall Tour du Gévaudan Languedoc-Roussillon
1st  Young rider classification
 9th Overall USA Pro Cycling Challenge
2016
 1st  Overall Vuelta a Asturias
1st  Young rider classification
1st Stage 1
 6th Prueba Villafranca de Ordizia
 8th Giro dell'Appennino
 8th GP Miguel Induráin
 9th Overall Volta a Catalunya
1st  Young rider classification
 9th Overall Vuelta a la Comunidad de Madrid
2018
 3rd Overall Colorado Classic
1st  Mountains classification
 5th Overall Tour of Utah
2019
 Tour de Suisse
1st  Mountains classification
1st Stage 9
 3rd Overall Tour du Haut Var
 Giro d'Italia
Held  after Stage 12
2020
 3rd Overall Vuelta a España
1st Stage 12
 4th Overall Tour de la Provence
2021
 1st Stage 5 Vuelta a Burgos
 3rd Classic Sud-Ardèche
 5th Overall Tour of the Alps
 8th Overall Giro d'Italia
 8th Overall Volta a Catalunya
2022
 2nd Overall Tour de Langkawi
 9th Overall Giro d'Italia
 9th Overall Tour of the Alps
2023
 6th Trofeo Serra de Tramuntana
 8th Overall Tirreno–Adriatico

General classification results timeline

References

External links

Hugh Carthy at CQranking

British male cyclists
Living people
1994 births
British Vuelta a España stage winners
Tour de Suisse stage winners
Sportspeople from Preston, Lancashire
20th-century British people
21st-century British people